Célestin-Anatole Calmels  (26 March 1822 – 23 March 1906) was a French sculptor who worked in Portugal, one of the most prominent sculptors in Lisbon of his day.

Among his most notable works are the allegorical sculptures atop the Rua Augusta Arch, Glory Crowning Genius and Valor, as well as the pediment of Lisbon City Hall, the equestrian statue of King Peter IV in Porto, the allegorical statues of Labour and Strength in the portal of the Palace of the Dukes of Palmela in Lisbon, and sculptures in the Mausoleum of the Dukes of Palmela in Prazeres Cemetery.

Honours
 Commander of the Order of Christ, Portugal
 Commander of the Order of Saint James of the Sword, Portugal

References 

1822 births
1906 deaths
French male sculptors
19th-century French sculptors
Portuguese sculptors
Sculptors from Paris
Commanders of the Order of Christ (Portugal)
Commanders of the Order of Saint James of the Sword
19th-century French male artists